This is a list of schools in West Sussex, England.

State-funded schools

Primary schools 

Albourne CE Primary School, Albourne
Aldingbourne Primary School, Westergate
All Saints CE Primary School, Horsham
Amberley CE Primary School, Amberley
Arundel CE Primary School, Arundel
Arunside School, Horsham
Ashington CE Primary School, Ashington
Ashurst CE Primary School, Steyning
Ashurst Wood Primary School, Ashurst Wood
Balcombe CE Primary School, Balcombe
Baldwins Hill Primary School, East Grinstead
Barnham Primary School, Barnham
Barns Green Primary School, Barns Green
Bartons Primary School, Bognor Regis
Bersted Green Primary School, Bognor Regis
The Bewbush Academy, Crawley
Billingshurst Primary School, Billingshurst
Birchwood Grove Community Primary School, Burgess Hill
Birdham CE Primary School, Birdham
Bishop Tufnell CE Primary School, Felpham
Blackthorns Community Primary Academy, Lindfield
Blackwell Primary School, East Grinstead
Bohunt Horsham, Horsham
Bolney CE Primary School, Bolney
Bolnore Village Primary School, Bolnore Village
Bosham Primary School, Bosham
Boxgrove CE Primary School, Boxgrove
Bramber Primary School, Worthing
Broadfield Primary Academy, Crawley
Broadwater CE Primary School, Worthing
Brook Infant School, Crawley
Buckingham Park Primary School, Shoreham-by-Sea
Bury CE Primary School, Bury
Camelsdale Primary School, Camelsdale
Castlewood Primary School, Southwater
Chesswood Junior School, Worthing
Chichester Free School, Runcton
Chidham Parochial Primary School, Chidham
Clapham and Patching CE Primary School, Clapham
Colgate Primary School, Colgate
Compton and Up Marden CE Primary School, Compton
Copthorne CE Junior School, Copthorne
Crawley Down Village CE School, Crawley Down
Desmond Anderson Primary Academy, Crawley
Downsbrook Primary School, Worthing
Downview Primary School, Felpham
Duncton CE Junior School, Duncton
Durrington Infant School, Durrington
Durrington Junior School, Durrington
Easebourne CE Primary School, Easebourne
East Preston Infant School, East Preston
East Preston Junior School, East Preston
East Wittering Community Primary School, East Wittering
Eastbrook Primary Academy, Southwick
Eastergate CE Primary School, Eastergate
Edward Bryant School, Bognor Regis
Elm Grove Primary School, Worthing
English Martyrs RC Primary School, Goring-by-Sea
Estcots Primary School, East Grinstead
Fairway Infant School, Copthorne
Fernhurst Primary School, Fernhurst
Ferring CE Primary School, Ferring
Field Place Infant School, Worthing
Fishbourne CE Primary School, Fishbourne
Fittleworth CE Village School, Fittleworth
Forge Wood Primary School, Crawley
Funtington Primary School, West Ashling
The Gattons Infant School, Burgess Hill
The Gatwick School, Crawley
Georgian Gardens Community Primary School, Rustington
Glebe Primary School, Southwick
The Globe Primary Academy, Lancing
Goring-by-Sea CE Primary School, Goring-by-Sea
Gossops Green Primary, Crawley
Graffham CE Infant School, Graffham
Greenway Academy, Horsham
Halsford Park Primary School, East Grinstead
Handcross Primary School, Handcross
Harlands Primary School, Haywards Heath
Harting CE Primary School, South Harting
Hassocks Infant School, Hassocks
Hawthorns Primary School, Durrington
Heene CE Primary School, Worthing
Heron Way Primary School, Horsham
Hilltop Primary School, Crawley
Holbrook Primary School, Horsham
Hollycombe Primary School, Milland
Holmbush Primary Academy, Shoreham-by-Sea
Holy Trinity CE Primary School, Cuckfield
Holy Trinity CE Primary School, Lower Beeding
Jessie Younghusband Primary School, Chichester
Jolesfield CE Primary School, Partridge Green
Kilnwood Vale Primary School, Faygate
Kingsham Primary School, Chichester
Kingslea Primary School, Horsham
Langley Green Primary School, Crawley
The Laurels Primary School, Worthing
Lavant CE Primary School, Lavant
Leechpool Primary School, Horsham
Lindfield Primary Academy, Lindfield
Littlehaven Infant School, Horsham
London Meed Community Primary School, Burgess Hill
Loxwood Primary School, Loxwood
Lyminster Primary School, Wick
Lyndhurst Infant School, Worthing
Maidenbower Infant School, Crawley
Maidenbower Junior School, Crawley
Manor Field Primary School, Burgess Hill
The March CE Primary School, Westhampnett
The Meads Primary School, East Grinstead
Medmerry Primary School, Selsey
Midhurst CE Primary School, Midhurst
The Mill Primary Academy, Crawley
Milton Mount Primary School, Crawley
North Heath Community Primary School, Horsham
North Lancing Primary School, Lancing
North Mundham Primary School, North Mundham
Northchapel Community Primary School, Northchapel
Northgate Primary School, Crawley
Northlands Wood Primary Academy, Haywards Heath
Northolmes Junior School, Horsham
Nyewood CE Infant School, Bognor Regis
Nyewood CE Junior School, Bognor Regis
The Oaks Primary School, Crawley
Orchards Junior School, Durrington
Our Lady Queen of Heaven RC Primary School, Crawley
Parklands Community Primary School, Chichester
Petworth CE Primary School, Petworth
Plaistow and Kirdford Primary School, Plaistow
Portfield Primary Academy, Chichester
Pound Hill Infant Academy, Crawley
Pound Hill Junior School, Crawley
Rake CE Primary School, Rake
River Beach Primary School Littlehampton
Rogate CE Primary School, Rogate
Rose Green Infant School, Rose Green
Rose Green Junior School, Rose Green
Rudgwick Primary School, Rudgwick
Rumboldswhyke CE Primary School, Chichester
Rusper Primary School, Rusper
Rustington Community Primary School, Rustington
St Andrew's CE Primary School, Crawley
St Andrew's CE Primary School, Nuthurst
St Augustine's CE Primary School, Scaynes Hill
St Catherine's RC Primary School, Littlehampton
St Francis of Assisi RC Primary School, Crawley
St Giles CE Primary School, Horsted Keynes
St James' CE Primary School, Coldwaltham
St John the Baptist CE Primary School, Findon
St John's RC Primary School, Horsham
St Joseph's CE Infant School, Chichester
St Joseph's CE Junior School, Chichester
St Joseph's RC Primary School, Haywards Heath
St Lawrence CE Primary School, Hurstpierpoint
St Margaret's CE Primary School, Angmering
St Margaret's CE Primary School, Crawley
St Mark's CE Primary School, Staplefield
St Mary's CE Primary School, Climping
St Mary's CE Primary School, East Grinstead
St Mary's CE Primary School, Horsham
St Mary's CE Primary School, Pulborough
St Mary's CE Primary School, Washington
St Mary's RC Primary School, Bognor Regis
St Mary's RC Primary School, Worthing
St Nicolas and St Mary CE Primary School, Shoreham-by-Sea
St Peter's CE Primary School, Ardingly
St Peter's CE Primary School, Cowfold
St Peter's CE Primary School, Henfield
St Peter's RC Primary School, Shoreham-by-Sea
St Philip's RC Primary School, Arundel
St Richard's RC Primary School, Chichester
St Robert Southwell RC Primary School, Horsham
St Wilfrid's CE Primary School, Haywards Heath
St Wilfrid's RC Primary School, Angmering
St Wilfrid's RC Primary School, Burgess Hill
Seal Primary Academy, Selsey
Seaside Primary School, Lancing
Seymour Primary School, Crawley
Sheddingdean Community Primary School, Burgess Hill
Shelley Primary School, Broadbridge Heath
Shipley CE Primary School, Shipley
Shoreham Beach Primary School, Shoreham-by-Sea
Sidlesham Primary School, Sidlesham
Singleton CE Primary School, Singleton
Slindon CE Primary School, Slindon
Slinfold CofE Primary School, Slinfold
Sompting Village Primary School, Sompting
South Bersted CE Primary School, South Bersted
Southbourne Infant School, Southbourne
Southbourne Junior School, Southbourne
Southgate Primary, Crawley
Southwater Infant Academy, Southwater
Southwater Junior Academy, Southwater
Southway Junior School, Burgess Hill
Southway Primary School, Bognor Regis
Springfield Infant School, Worthing
Stedham Primary School, Stedham
Steyning CE Primary School, Steyning
Storrington Primary School, Storrington
Summerlea Community Primary School, Rustington
Swiss Gardens Primary School, Shoreham-by-Sea
Tangmere Primary Academy, Tangmere
Thakeham Primary School, Thakeham
Thomas A Becket Infant School, Worthing
Thomas A Becket Junior School, Worthing
Thorney Island Community Primary School, Thorney Island
Three Bridges Primary School, Crawley
Trafalgar Community Infant School, Horsham
Turners Hill CE Primary School, Turners Hill
Twineham CE Primary School, Twineham
Upper Beeding Primary School, Upper Beeding
Vale School, Worthing
Walberton and Binsted CE Primary School, Walberton
Warden Park Primary Academy, Haywards Heath
Warnham CE Primary School, Warnham
Waterfield Primary School, Crawley
West Chiltington Community Primary School, West Chiltington
West Dean CE Primary School, West Dean
West Green Primary School, Crawley
West Hoathly CE Primary School, West Hoathly
West Park CE Primary School, Worthing
West Wittering Parochial CE School, West Wittering
Westbourne Primary School, Westbourne
White Meadows Primary Academy, Littlehampton
Whytemead Primary School, Worthing
William Penn School, Horsham
The Windmills Junior School, Hassocks
Wisborough Green Primary School, Wisborough Green
Woodgate Primary School, Pease Pottage
Yapton CE Primary School, Yapton

Secondary schools 

The Academy, Selsey, Selsey
Angmering School, Angmering
Bishop Luffa School, Chichester
Bohunt Horsham, Horsham
Bohunt School Worthing, Worthing
Bourne Community College, Southbourne
The Burgess Hill Academy, Burgess Hill
Chichester Free School, Runcton
Chichester High School, Chichester
Davison High School, Worthing
Downlands Community School, Hassocks
Durrington High School, Durrington
Felpham Community College, Felpham
The Forest School, Horsham
The Gatwick School, Crawley
Hazelwick School, Crawley
Holy Trinity School, Crawley
Ifield Community College, Crawley
Imberhorne School, East Grinstead
The Littlehampton Academy, Littlehampton
Midhurst Rother College, Midhurst
Millais School, Horsham
Oathall Community College, Haywards Heath
Oriel High School, Crawley
Ormiston Six Villages Academy, Westergate
The Regis School, Bognor Regis
Sackville School, East Grinstead
St Andrew's CofE High School for Boys, Worthing
St Oscar Romero Catholic School, Goring-by-Sea
St Paul's Catholic College, Burgess Hill
St Philip Howard Catholic High School, Barnham
St Wilfrid's Catholic School, Crawley
Shoreham Academy, Shoreham-by-Sea
Sir Robert Woodard Academy, Sompting
Steyning Grammar School, Steyning
Tanbridge House School, Horsham
Thomas Bennett Community College, Crawley
Warden Park Secondary Academy, Cuckfield
The Weald School, Billingshurst
Worthing High School, Worthing

Special and alternative schools 

Brantridge School, Staplefield
Chalkhill Education Centre, Haywards Heath
Cornfield School, Littlehampton
Fordwater School, Chichester
Herons Dale School, Shoreham-by-Sea
Littlegreen Academy, Compton
Manor Green College, Crawley
Manor Green Primary School, Crawley
Oak Grove College, Worthing
Palatine School, Worthing
Queen Elizabeth II Silver Jubilee School, Horsham
St Anthony's School, Chichester
West Sussex Alternative Provision College, Burgess Hill
Woodlands Meed, Burgess Hill

Further education 
Central Sussex College
Chichester College
Northbrook College
The College of Richard Collyer
Worthing College

Independent schools

Primary and preparatory schools 

Brambletye School, East Grinstead
Conifers School, Easebourne
Cottesmore School, Crawley
Cumnor House School, Haywards Heath
Dorset House School, Bury
Great Walstead School, Haywards Heath
Handcross Park School, Handcross
Highfield and Brookham Schools, Linchmere
Lancing College Prep School, Worthing
Oakwood School, Chichester
Pennthorpe School, Rudgwick
The Prebendal School, Chichester
Reflections Small School, Worthing
Sompting Abbotts Preparatory School, Sompting
Westbourne House School, Chichester
Windlesham House School, Washington

Senior and all-through schools 

Atelier21 Future School, Crawley
Ardingly College, Haywards Heath
Burgess Hill Girls, Burgess Hill
Christ's Hospital, Horsham
Farlington School, Horsham
Great Ballard School, Chichester
Hurstpierpoint College, Hurstpierpoint
Lancing College, Lancing
Our Lady of Sion School, Worthing
Rikkyo School in England, Rudgwick
Seaford College, Petworth
Shoreham College, Shoreham-By-Sea
Worth School, Crawley

Special and alternative schools 

Apple Orchard School, Slinfold
The Amicus School, Fontwell
Central Education Centre, Haywards Heath
Educate U, Worthing
Farney Close School, Bolney
Ingfield Manor School, Billingshurst
LVS Hassocks, Sayers Common
Manor House School, Slinfold
Muntham House School, Horsham
My Choice School Arundel, Warningcamp
New Barn School, Broadbridge Heath
Philpots Manor School, West Hoathly
Red Balloon Worthing Learner Centre, Worthing
Seadown School, Worthing
Serenity School, Crawley
Slindon College, Slindon
Springboard Education, Lancing

See also 
University of Chichester
Schools in Crawley, West Sussex
Schools in Worthing, West Sussex

References

West Sussex
Schools in West Sussex
Lists of buildings and structures in West Sussex